Matt Oliver (born June 14, 1979), is an American musician and producer. Oliver is a former member of indie rock bands Sound Team and TV Torso and has toured extensively with The Walkmen's Hamilton Leithauser. Oliver's engineering credits include sessions with Bill Callahan
, The Strange Boys, Ola Podrida, Dungen
, Future Islands, Daniel Johnston, Jon Spencer, Los Lobos, Mike Watt, J Mascis, Shabazz Palaces, Hundred Visions, Theophilus London, Ty Segall, Wire, and Wild Beasts.

Selected discography

With TV Torso
Days of Being Wild b/w I Can See Your Face – 7-inch vinyl/MP3/FLAC digital download (2009; Self-released)
The Black Mask b/w The Eye in the Pyramid – 7-inch vinyl/MP3/FLAC digital download (2009; Visible Hand)
Status Quo Vadis EP – 12" vinyl/MP3/FLAC digital download (2009; Visible Hand)
Clear Lake Strangler EP – MP3/FLAC digital download (2009; Visible Hand)

Collaborations

Producer-Engineer-Mixer-Instrumentalist
The Strange Boys Be Brave single – Engineer – CD/7-inch (2010; In the Red (US), Rough Trade (UK))
Austin Leonard Jones Sundowners – CD/LP (2011; Jerry Jeff Stalker)
Daniel Johnston True Love Will Find You in the End single – Engineer – (2012) Weeds Original Soundtrack
Matthew and the Atlas EP – Produce/Engineer/Mix – CD/LP (2012; Communion (UK))
Love Inks, Generation Club – Mixer – CD/LP (2013; Monofonus Press)
White Denim Corsicana Lemonade – Electric Piano, Piano, Synthesizer – LP, CD, MP3 (2013; Downtown (US), PIAS (Australia))
Ola Podrida Ghosts Go Blind – Produce/Engineer – CD/LP (2013; Western Vinyl)
Tiger Waves Weekends b/w Sundressed – Produce/Engineer/Mix – 7-inch/MP3 (2013; Canvasback Music)
Chief Scout "See" EP – Co-Produce/Engineer – (2014; Columbia)
Peter Matthew Bauer Liberation! – Co-produce, Arrange, Guitar, Mix – LP, CD, MP3 (2014; Mexican Summer (US), Memphis Industries (UK))
Bop English Constant Bop – Co Produce, Arrange, Guitar, Piano, Electric Piano, Synthesizer, Tape effects – LP, CD, MP3 (2015; Blood and Biscuits (UK), Downtown (US))

Live to 2-track Tape for Daytrotter

Neon Indian – MP3/FLAC – Engineer/Mix – December 4, 2009
Mark Olson & Gary Louris – MP3/FLAC – Engineer/Mix – July 1, 2009
Daniel Johnston – MP3/FLAC – Engineer/Mix – January 10, 2010
Liars – MP3/FLAC – Engineer/Mix – July 19, 2010
Matt Morris – MP3/FLAC – Engineer/Mix/Master – July 22, 2010
Man or Astro-man? – MP3/FLAC – Engineer/Mix/Master – July 29, 2010
Javelin – MP3/FLAC – Engineer/Mix – August 12, 2010
Danny Barnes – MP3/FLAC – Engineer/Mix – August 14, 2010
The Depreciation Guild – MP3/FLAC – Engineer/Mix – August 24, 2010
White Mystery – MP3/FLAC – Engineer/Mix – September 15, 2010
The Black Angels – MP3/FLAC – Engineer/Mix – November 12, 2010
Alejandro Escovedo – MP3/FLAC – Engineer/Mix – November 15, 2010
Suuns – MP3/FLAC – Engineer/Mix – November 17, 2010
Robert Randolph and the Family Band – MP3/FLAC – Engineer/Mix – November 22, 2010
S. Carey – MP3/FLAC – Engineer/Mix – November 23, 2010
No Joy – MP3/FLAC – Engineer/Mix – November 30, 2010
Young the Giant – MP3/FLAC – Engineer/Mix – December 20, 2010
Old 97's – MP3/FLAC – Engineer/Mix – December 21, 2010
Ty Segall – MP3/FLAC – Engineer/Mix – December 28, 2010
Twin Shadow – MP3/FLAC – Engineer/Mix – January 5, 2011
Happy Birthday – MP3/FLAC – Engineer/Mix – January 7, 2011
Dom – MP3/FLAC – Engineer/Mix – January 31, 2011
Astronautalis – MP3/FLAC – Engineer/Mix – February 22, 2011
Pete Yorn – MP3/FLAC – Engineer/Mix – February 24, 2011
The Black – MP3/FLAC – Engineer/Mix – February 25, 2011
Los Lobos – MP3/FLAC – Engineer/Mix – March 7, 2011
Twilight Hotel – MP3/FLAC – Engineer/Mix – March 11, 2011
Theophilus London – MP3/FLAC – Engineer/Mix – March 14, 2011
Chris Brecht and Dead Flowers – MP3/FLAC – Engineer/Mix – March 16, 2011
The Futureheads – MP3/FLAC – Engineer/Mix – March 17, 2011
Railroad Earth – MP3/FLAC – Engineer/Mix – March 21, 2011
Turbo Fruits – MP3/FLAC – Engineer/Mix – March 22, 2011
Pink Nasty – MP3/FLAC – Engineer/Mix – March 27, 2011
Soft Healer – MP3/FLAC – Engineer/Mix – March 31, 2011
Mike and the Moonpies – MP3/FLAC – Engineer/Mix – April 9, 2011
The Pains of Being Pure at Heart – MP3/FLAC – Engineer/Mix – April 9, 2011
Yuck – MP3/FLAC – Engineer/Mix – April 11, 2011
Hayes Carll – MP3/FLAC – Engineer/Mix – April 18, 2011
The Get Up Kids – MP3/FLAC – Engineer/Mix – April 25, 2011
Bill Callahan – MP3/FLAC – Engineer/Mix – April 27, 2011
Busdriver – MP3/FLAC – Engineer/Mix – May 2, 2011
Raphael Saadiq – MP3/FLAC – Engineer/Mix – May 3, 2011
The Vaccines – MP3/FLAC – Engineer/Mix – May 4, 2011
Atari Teenage riot – MP3/FLAC – Engineer/Mix – May 9, 2011
Dashboard Confessional – MP3/FLAC – Engineer/Mix – May 13, 2011
Dignan – MP3/FLAC – Engineer/Mix – May 15, 2011
Josh T. Pearson – MP3/FLAC – Engineer/Mix – May 16, 2011
MIddle Brother – MP3/FLAC – Engineer/Mix – May 18, 2011
Reggie Watts – MP3/FLAC – Engineer/Mix – May 23, 2011
Jesse Dayton – MP3/FLAC – Engineer/Mix – May 29, 2011
Pujol – MP3/FLAC – Engineer/Mix – May 30, 2011
Bass Drum of Death – MP3/FLAC – Engineer/Mix – June 1, 2011
The Black Lips – MP3/FLAC – Engineer/Mix – June 8, 2011
Sahara Smith – MP3/FLAC – Engineer/Mix – June 14, 2011
The Coathangers – MP3/FLAC – Engineer/Mix – July 22, 2011
My Education/Theta Naught – MP3/FLAC – Engineer/Mix – July 23, 2011
The Death Set – MP3/FLAC – Engineer/Mix – July 25, 2011
Matt the Electrician – MP3/FLAC – Engineer/Mix/Master – September 8, 2011
J Mascis – MP3/FLAC – June 6, 2011 
Balmorhea – MP3/FLAC – June 22, 2011 
Laura Stevenson – MP3/FLAC – June 22, 2011 
Sleeping in the Aviary – MP3/FLAC – June 26, 2011 
Matthew and the Atlas – MP3/FLAC – July 5, 2011 
Seryn – MP3/FLAC – July 12, 2011
Shabazz Palaces – MP3/FLAC – Engineer/Mix – July 13, 2011
The Knux – MP3/FLAC – Engineer/Mix – August 3, 2011
Asleep at the Wheel – MP3/FLAC – Engineer/Mix – August 11, 2011
Teen Daze- MP3/FLAC – Engineer/Mix – August 13, 2011
Love Inks – MP3/FLAC – Engineer/Mix – August 17, 2011
Grouplove – MP3/FLAC – Engineer/Mix – August 18, 2011
Fresh Millions – MP3/FLAC – Engineer/Mix – August 19, 2011
Mount Kimbie – MP3/FLAC – Engineer/Mix – August 22, 2011
Mister Heavenly – MP3/FLAC – Engineer/Mix – August 29, 2011
Cerebral Ballzy – MP3/FLAC – Engineer/Mix – September 21, 2011
Ume – MP3/FLAC – Engineer/Mix – September 24, 2011
Asobi Seksu – MP3/FLAC – Engineer/Mix – September 27, 2011
Mat Kearney – MP3/FLAC – Engineer/Mix – October 5, 2011
Thursday – MP3/FLAC – Engineer/Mix – October 6, 2011
Robert Ellis – MP3/FLAC – Engineer/Mix – October 21, 2011
James McMurtry – MP3/FLAC – Engineer/Mix – October 28, 2011
G. Love – MP3/FLAC – Engineer/Mix – November 1, 2011
Mike Watt – MP3/FLAC – Engineer/Mix/Master – November 4, 2011
Acrylics – MP3/FLAC – Engineer/Mix – November 7, 2011
R. Stevie Moore – MP3/FLAC – Engineer/Mix – November 8, 2011
Carl Broemel – MP3/FLAC – Engineer/Mix – November 9, 2011
Future Islands – MP3/FLAC – Engineer/Mix – November 15, 2011
P.S. I Love You – MP3/FLAC – Engineer/Mix – November 15, 2011
Rx Bandits – MP3/FLAC – Engineer/Mix – November 16, 2011
Frank Turner – MP3/FLAC – Engineer/Mix – November 17, 2011
Autolux – MP3/FLAC – Engineer/Mix – November 18, 2011
Salesman w/Wayne Kramer – MP3/FLAC – Engineer/Mix – November 19, 2011
The Antlers – MP3/FLAC – Engineer/Mix/Master – November 23, 2011
Surfer Blood – MP3/FLAC – Engineer/Mix/Master – November 25, 2011
Crooked Fingers – MP3/FLAC – Engineer/Mix/Master – November 27, 2011
Trevor Hall – MP3/FLAC – Engineer/Mix/Master – November 27, 2011
White Dress – MP3/FLAC – Engineer/Mix/Master – November 29, 2011
Cass McCombs – MP3/FLAC – Engineer/Mix/Master – November 29, 2011
Ocote Soul Sounds – MP3/FLAC – Engineer/Mix/Master – December 3, 2011
My Jerusalem – MP3/FLAC – Engineer/Mix/Master – December 5, 2011
Charlie Faye – MP3/FLAC – Engineer/Mix – December 11, 2011 
Jon Spencer Blues Explosion – MP3/FLAC – Engineer/Mix – December 12, 2011
Eastern Conference Champions – MP3/FLAC – Engineer/Mix – December 17, 2011
Andrew Jackson Jihad – MP3/FLAC – Engineer/Mix – December 22, 2011
The One AM Radio – MP3/FLAC – Engineer/Mix/Master – December 22, 2011
Scott H. Biram – MP3/FLAC – Engineer/Mix/Master – December 26, 2011
Moonhearts – MP3/FLAC – Engineer/Mix – January 1, 2012
James Hand – MP3/FLAC – Engineer/Mix – January 3, 2012
Efterklang – MP3/FLAC – Engineer/Mix – January 4, 2012
The Gourds – MP3/FLAC – Engineer/Mix – January 5, 2012
Royal Baths – MP3/FLAC – Engineer/Mix – January 7, 2012
Residual Echoes – MP3/FLAC – Engineer/Mix – January 8, 2012
Smith Westerns – MP3/FLAC – Engineer/Mix – January 10, 2012
Dwarves – MP3/FLAC – Engineer/Mix – January 12, 2012
Jacuzzi Boys – MP3/FLAC – Engineer/Mix – January 12, 2012
The Stepkids – MP3/FLAC – Engineer/Mix – January 12, 2012
Marnie Stern – MP3/FLAC – Engineer/Mix – January 27, 2012
Nik Freitas – MP3/FLAC – Engineer/Mix – January 30, 2012
The Cave Singers – MP3/FLAC – Engineer/Mix – January 30, 2012
Eux Autres – MP3/FLAC – Engineer/Mix – February 4, 2012
Corb Lund – MP3/FLAC – Engineer/Mix – February 15, 2012
Gomez – MP3/FLAC – Engineer/Mix – February 16, 2012
Little Hurricane – MP3/FLAC – Engineer/Mix – February 23, 2012
One Hundred Flowers – MP3/FLAC – Engineer/Mix – February 23, 2012
The Fiery Furnaces – MP3/FLAC – Engineer/Mix – February 29, 2012
Noah and the Whale – MP3/FLAC – Engineer/Mix – February 29, 2012
Avi Buffalo – MP3/FLAC – Engineer/Mix – March 13, 2012
Bosque Brown – MP3/FLAC – Engineer/Mix – March 13, 2012
Speak – MP3/FLAC – Engineer/Mix – March 16, 2012
Rocky Votolato – MP3/FLAC – Engineer/Mix – March 22, 2012
Beats Antique – MP3/FLAC – Engineer/Mix – March 20, 2012
Band of Heathens – MP3/FLAC – Engineer/Mix – March 22, 2012
The Raveonettes – MP3/FLAC – Engineer/Mix – March 30, 2012
We Are Scientists – MP3/FLAC – Engineer/Mix – April 24, 2012
Heavy Cream – MP3/FLAC – Engineer/Mix – April 27, 2012
Dungen – MP3/FLAC – Engineer/Mix – April 27, 2012
The Posies – MP3/FLAC – Engineer/Mix – May 2, 2012
Lord Buffalo  – MP3/FLAC – Engineer/Mix/Master – May 6, 2012
Gold Panda – MP3/FLAC – Engineer/Mix – June 6, 2012
Erin McKeown – MP3/FLAC – Engineer/Mix – June 7, 2012
Martin Sexton – MP3/FLAC – Engineer/Mix – June 14, 2012
Wild Beasts – MP3/FLAC – Engineer/Mix -August 14, 2012
Sic Alps – MP3/FLAC – Engineer/Mix – February 21, 2012
Chateau Marmont – MP3/FLAC – Engineer/Mix – February 27, 2012
Carrie Rodriguez – MP3/FLAC – Engineer/Mix – November 12, 2012
Wire – MP3/FLAC – Engineer/Mix – January 23, 2012

With Sound Team (2001–2007) 
Sound Team (Original Release) – CD-r (2000; Self-released)
I'm Getting Laid Tonight b/w Folkswinger (7-inch single) – Vinyl (2000; Self-released)
 Into the Lens – CD-r (2001; Self-released)
Yes Special Cassette  – Cassette (2004; Self-released)
Tour-only 4-song CD-r – CD-r (2005; Self-released)
Marathon – 12" LP (2005; St. Ives/Secretly Canadian)
WORK EP  – CD/LP (2006; Capitol (US), Parlophone (UK))
Movie Monster – CD/LP (2006; Capitol (US), Parlophone (UK))
Born to Please – CD/7-inch UK-only single (2006; Parlophone)
Empty Rooms – 12" LP (2007; Self-released)

References

External links
 Matt Oliver Official Website
Big Orange Recording Studio

Living people
Musicians from Austin, Texas
Musicians from Texas
1979 births